Journaling may refer to:
 Electronic message journaling, tracking and retention of electronic communications
 Journaling file system, a technique in computer file systems to prevent corruption
 Journal therapy
 Writing therapy, a form of psychotherapy
 Writing in a diary